Korenizatsiia or korenization ("indigenization") was an early policy of the Soviet Union for the integration of non-Russian nationalities into the governments of their specific Soviet republics. In the 1920s the policy promoted representatives of the titular nation, and their national minorities, into the lower administrative-levels of the local government, bureaucracy, and nomenklatura of their Soviet republics. The main idea of the korenizatsiia was to grow communist cadres for every nationality. The policy practically ended in the mid-1930s with the deportations of various nationalities.

Politically and culturally, the nativization policy aimed to eliminate Russian domination and culture in Soviet republics where ethnic Russians did not constitute a majority. This policy was implemented even in areas with large Russian-speaking populations; for instance, all children in Ukraine were taught in the Ukrainian language in school. The policies of korenizatsiia facilitated the Communist Party's establishment of the local languages in government and education, in publishing, in culture, and in public life. In that manner, the cadre of the local Communist Party were promoted to every level of government, and ethnic Russians working in said governments were required to learn the local language and culture of the given Soviet republic.

Beginnings 
The nationalities policy was formulated by the Bolshevik party in 1913, four years before they came to power in Russia. Vladimir Lenin sent a young Joseph Stalin (himself a Georgian and therefore an ethnic minority member) to Vienna, which was a very ethnically diverse city due to its status as capital of the Austro-Hungarian empire. Stalin reported back to Moscow with his ideas for the policy. It was summarized in Stalin's pamphlet (his first scholarly publication), Marxism and the National Question (1913). Ironically Stalin would also be the major proponent of its eventual dismemberment and the reemergence of Russification.

Faced with the massive non-Russian opposition to his regime, Lenin in late 1919 convinced his associates that their government had to stop the cultural administrative and linguistic policies it was following in the non-Russian republics. As adopted in 1923 korenizatsiia involved teaching and administration in the language of the republic; and promoting non-Russians to positions of power in Republic administrations and the party, including for a time the creation of a special group of soviets called natssovety (nationality councils) in their own natsraiony (nationality regions) based on concentrations of minorities within what were minority republics. For example, in Ukraine in the late 1920s there were even natssovety for Russians and Estonians.

This policy was meant to partially reverse decades of Russification, or promotion of Russian identity culture and language in non-Russian territories that had taken place during the imperial period. It won over many previously anti-bolshevik non-Russians throughout the country. It also provoked hostility among some Russians and Russified non-Russians in non-Russian republics.

In 1920s, the society was still not "Socialist". There was animosity towards the Russians and towards other nationalities on the part of the Russians, but there were also conflicts and rivalries among other nationalities.

Against Great-Russian chauvinism 
In 1923 at the 12th Party Congress, Stalin identified two threats to the success of the party's "nationalities policy": Great Power Chauvinism (velikoderzhavnyi shovinizm; great state chauvinism) and local nationalism. However, he described the former as the greater danger:

[The] Great-Russian chauvinist spirit, which is becoming stronger and stronger owing to the N.E.P., . . . [finds] expression in an arrogantly disdainful and heartlessly bureaucratic attitude on the part of Russian Soviet officials towards the needs and requirements of the national republics. The multi-national Soviet state can become really durable, and the co-operation of the peoples within it really fraternal, only if these survivals are vigorously and irrevocably eradicated from the practice of our state institutions. Hence, the first immediate task of our Party is vigorously to combat the survivals of Great-Russian chauvinism.

The main danger, Great-Russian chauvinism, should be kept in check by the Russians themselves, for the sake of the larger goal of building socialism. Within the (minority) nationality areas new institutions should be organized giving the state a national (minority) character everywhere, built on the use of the nationality languages in government and education, and on the recruitment and promotion of leaders from the ranks of minority groups. On the central level the nationalities should be represented in the Soviet of Nationalities.

Creation of socialist nations 
The main idea of the korenizatsiia was to grow communist cadres for every nationality. By the mid-1930s the percentage of locals in both the party and state service grew considerably.

The initial period of korenizatsiia went together with the development of national-territorial administrative units and national cultures. The latter was reflected above all in the areas of language construction and education. For several of the small nationalities in Russia that had no literary language, a "Committee of the North" helped to create alphabets so that the national languages could be taught in schools and literacy could be brought to the people in their native languages—and the minorities would thereby be brought from backwardness to the modern world. And in the very large Ukrainian Republic, the program of Ukrainianization led to a profound shift of the language of instruction in schools to Ukrainian.

In 1930, Stalin proclaimed at the 16th Party Congress that building socialism was a period of blossoming of national cultures. The final goal would be to merge into one international culture with a common language. Meanwhile, the first five-year plan in 1928–1931 was a period of radicalism, utopianism and violence in an atmosphere of "cultural revolution" . Russian cultural heritage was under attack, churches were closed, old specialists were dismissed, and science and art were proletarianized.

The Bolsheviks' tactics in their struggle to neutralise nationalist aspirations led to political results by the beginning of the 1930s. The old structure of the Russian Empire had been destroyed and a hierarchical federal state structure, based on the national principle, was created. The structure was nationality-based states in which nationality cultures were blossoming, and nationality languages were spoken and used at schools and in local administration. The transition was real, not merely a centralized Russian empire camouflaged.

The 17th Party congress in 1934, proclaimed that the building of the material basis for a socialist society had succeeded. The Soviet Union first became an officially socialist society in 1936 when the new constitution was adopted. The new constitution stated that the many socialist nations had transformed on a voluntary basis into a harmonious union. According to the new constitution there were 11 socialist republics, 22 autonomous republics, nine autonomous regions and nine national territories. At the same time, administration was now greatly centralised. All the Republics were now harnessed to serve one common socialist state.

End of korenizatsiia

Purges of national cadre 
Between 1933 and 1938 korenizatsiia was not actually repealed. Its provisions merely stopped being enforced. There also began purges of the leaderships of the national republics and territories. The charge against non-Russians was that they had instigated national strife and oppressed the Russians or other minorities in the republics. In 1937 it was proclaimed  that local elites had become hired agents and their goal had become dismemberment of the Soviet Union and the restoration of capitalism. Now it was time to see that the Russians got fair treatment. National leaderships of the republics and autonomies were liquidated en masse.

Reversal to Russification 
By the mid-1930s, with purges in some of the national areas, the policy of korenizatsiia took a new turn, and by the end of the 1930s the policy of promoting local languages began to be balanced by greater Russianization, though perhaps not overt Russification or attempts to assimilate the minorities. By this time, non-Russians found their appetite whetted rather than satiated by korenizatsiia and there was indication it was encouraging inter-ethnic violence to the extent that the territorial integrity of the USSR would be in danger. In addition, ethnic Russians resented the institutionalized and artificial "reverse discrimination" that benefited non-Russians and regarded them as ungrateful and manipulative as a result. Another concern was that the Soviet Union's westernmost minorities - Belarusians, Ukrainians, Poles, Finns etc - who had been previously treated with conscious benevolence in order to provide propaganda value to members of their ethnic groups in nations bordering the USSR (and thus facilitating future national unification, which would then bring about territorial expansion of the USSR) were now instead increasingly seen as vulnerable to influence from across the border, "fifth columns" for expansionist states seeking to acquire Soviet territory inhabited by their own ethnic group. The adherence of the masses to national rather than class identity was as strong in Russia as in other republics and regions. Between 1937 and 1953, racial policies began to creep into nationality policies, with certain nationalities seen as having immutable traits, particularly nationalities in the unstable borderlands. 

Moreover, Stalin seemed set on greatly reducing the number of officially recognized nationalities by contracting the official list of nationalities in the 1939 census, compared with the 1926 census. The development of so-called "national schools" in which the languages of minority nationalities were the main media of instruction continued, spreading literacy and universal education in many national minority languages, while teaching Russian as a required subject of study. The term korenizatsiia went out of use in the latter half of the 1930s, replaced by more bureaucratic expressions, such as "selection and placement of national cadres".

From 1937 the central press started to praise Russian language and Russian culture. Mass campaigns were organized to denounce the "enemies of the people". "Bourgeois nationalists" were new enemies of the Russian people which had suppressed the Russian language. The policy of indigenization was abandoned. In the following years the Russian language became a compulsory subject in all Soviet schools.

The pre-revolution Russian nationalism was also rehabilitated. Many of the heroes of Russian history were re-appropriated for glorification. The Russian people became the "elder brother" of the "Socialist family of nations". A new kind of patriotism, Soviet patriotism, was declared to mean a willingness to fight for the Socialist fatherland.

In 1938 Russian became a mandatory subject of study in all non-Russian schools. In general the cultural and linguistic russification reflected the overall centralization imposed by Stalin. The Cyrillic script was instituted for a number of Soviet languages, including the languages of Central Asia that in the late 1920s had been given Latin alphabets to replace Arabic ones.

See also 
 National delimitation in the Soviet Union
 Ukrainization
 Russification
 Latinization (USSR)
 Bilingual education
 Declaration of Rights of Peoples of Russia
 Sovietization of : the Baltic states, the Caucasus, Georgia, Armenia

References

Citations

Bibliography 
 
 
 
 
 
 ,  (hardcover).
 

Politics of the Soviet Union
Ideology of the Communist Party of the Soviet Union
Soviet internal politics
Soviet ethnic policy
Soviet phraseology